FC Cherkashchyna was a professional Ukrainian football club from the city of Cherkasy. The club's home ground was Central Stadium which was refurbished in 2003 and has a capacity of 10,321.

The club became the first that managed to reach semi-finals of the Ukrainian Cup in 2014, while playing in the Ukrainian Second League.

Established in 2010, the club was restructured in 2014. The club was dissolved in July 2018 and reformed as another new project based on its academy in Bilozirya.

Team names
 2004–2009 (first club)
 2004–2009: FC Khodak Cherkasy
 2010–2018 (second club)
 2010–2014: FC Slavutych Cherkasy
 2014: FC Slavutych–Zorya Cherkasy
 2014–2018: FC Cherkaskyi Dnipro
 2018–2021 (third club)
 2018–2019: FC Cherkashchyna-Akademiya Bilozirya
 2019–2021: FC Cherkashchyna

History

Khodak Cherkasy
In 2004, there was registered club FC Khodak Cherkasy at a local food factory owned by Volodymyr Khodak. The factory team existed at least since 1998, but was registered as Khodak in 2004. Previously in 1983–1991, Volodymyr Khodak worked in field of sports in Cherkasy Oblast and headed the regional branch of Soviet DOSAAF. The new club played at regional competitions of Cherkasy Oblast. Beside own football team, the Khodak company also sponsored the city's professional basketball team Cherkaski Mavpy. In the late October 2009 Khodak lost to another amateur club Karpaty Yaremche at the Ukrainian Amateur Cup final consisted of two legs. After Ukrainian League Cup (2010) the club has disappeared.

Slavutych – Cherkaskyi Dnipro

In 2010, on initiative of the Cherkasy Oblast Governor Serhiy Tulub a new club was created under the name of Slavutych and supposedly without any relations to Dnipro. There is an idea that the new club was created based on former amateur club FC Khodak Cherkasy. In interview to regional sports newspaper "Cherkaskyi Sport" on 5 December 2019, the former player of Khodak acknowledged that the newly formed Slavutych was created based on Khodak. The club's vice-president became a leader of Party of Regions in Cherkasy Oblast Volodymyr Khodak.

In 2010, the new club applied for the Second League, but their application was denied. The deputy chairman of the Cherkasy Oblast said that the Football Federation has shown to much of their principle. The club started out in the 2011 Ukrainian Football Amateur League. The club submitted its license to the Professional Football League of Ukraine and was accepted into the Ukrainian Second League for the 2011–12 season. The June 20, 2011 decision of the Central Council of PFL team accepted the team's professional status. The new club received a new bus for transport as a gift and expansion for its sporting facilities. There were allocated funds on reconstruction of Tsentralnyi Stadion and Volodymyr Khodak confirmed that were expanded some of the stadium's facility, while others are expected to be completed in near future.

Soon after the establishment of the club (in 2011), the Dnipro ultras asked the club's leadership to return the city's club its original name of Dnipro instead of Slavutych and recognize the original club as a direct predecessor of Slavutych.

In 2013, the club was coached by former Ukrainian international footballer and the first captain of national team Ihor Petrov who in 2015 decided to develop football in the Russian occupied eastern Ukraine. In November 2013 on initiative of Serhiy Tulub, there was created the club's Supervisory Board headed by Valeriy Cherniak, while Volodymyr Lashkul, an owner of FC Zorya Bilozirya, became the club's general director. Serhiy Tulub was elected as an honorary president of the club. After Euromaidan in Kyiv, Serhiy Tulub ran (at night on 20–21 March 2014) and FC Cherkashchyna was taken under supervision of Lashkul.

With the ongoing Russian aggression against Ukraine, in March 2014 the club leadership was changed with a banker Ihor Doroshenko (Bank Mykhailivsky) replacing former Ukrainian statesman Serhiy Tulub.

The club known as FC Slavutych Cherkasy in July 2014 merged with neighbors FC Zorya Bilozirya and was initially renamed, Slavutych-Zorya Cherkasy. However the club decided to have input from their fans and the club was renamed to Cherkaskyi Dnipro. It placed the year of establishment of FC Dnipro Cherkasy 1955 on its club's shield.

On 30 October 2017, the club was reconstituted as United Football Club of the Cherkasy Region territorial communes "Cherkaskyi Dnipro – Bilozirya Academy", but renaming process was cancelled in December 2017.

Cherkashchyna-Akademiya
The club was dissolved in July 2018 and reorganized based on its academy in Bilozirya. FC Zorya-Akademia Bilozirya changed its name to FC Cherkashchyna-Akademiya-2 Bilozirya and continues to compete at regional level.

On 1 February 2019, the long-time head coach of Dnipro-Slavutych-Cherkashchyna Oleksandr Kyrylyuk expressed his expectations to get his club promoted to the First League approving the current format and composition of the Second League.

In September 2019, the former president of Cherkashchyna Volodymyr Lashkul announced that he withdraws financing of the club. Right away there surfaced talks about FC Cherkashchyna will dissolve. Lashkul pointed out to lack of interest to the club from local authorities and new MFC Dnipro Cherkasy that joined the Ukrainian Football Amateur League in 2019 with plans to join the Ukrainian Second League in 2020.

Soon after the Lushkul's state the club's general director Yuriy Kolesnyk stated that whoever spreads information about withdrawal of Cherkashchyna, he is the team's enemy number one.

During winter break 2019–20, the senior team was abandoned by its owners and taken over by Football Federation of Cherkasy Oblast to avoid withdrawal of the club mid season. The former owners reorganized based on their own club FC Zorya-Akademia Bilozirya.

At the end of February 2020, it was announced that the club has means to finish the season. Few days later it was announced that the club plans to appoint a new head coach, presumably Denys Marynchuk.

Honours

Cherkaskyi Dnipro
 Ukrainian First League
 Runners-up (1): 2015–16
 PFL U-19
 Winners (1): 2016–17
 Runners-up (1): 2017–18
 Ukrainian Second League
 Winners (1): 2014–15

Khodak Cherkasy
 Ukrainian Amateur Cup
 Runners-up (1): 2009
 Cherkasy Oblast Football Championship
 Winners (3): 2005, 2006, 2008
 Runners-up (1): 2004

Players

Last squad

League and cup history 
{|class="wikitable"
|-bgcolor="#efefef"
! Season
! Div.
! Pos.
! Pl.
! W
! D
! L
! GS
! GA
! P
!Domestic Cup
!colspan=2|Other
!Notes
|-
|align=left colspan=14 align=center|FC Khodak Cherkasy
|-bgcolor=SteelBlue
|align=center rowspan=3|2006
|align=center rowspan=3|4th
|align=center|1
|align=center|4
|align=center|2
|align=center|2
|align=center|0
|align=center|8
|align=center|3
|align=center|8
|align=center rowspan=3|
|align=center rowspan=2|
|align=center rowspan=2|
|align=center|
|-bgcolor=SteelBlue
|align=center|2
|align=center|6
|align=center|2
|align=center|3
|align=center|1
|align=center|7
|align=center|4
|align=center|9
|align=center|
|-bgcolor=SteelBlue
|align=center|2
|align=center|3
|align=center|1
|align=center|2
|align=center|0
|align=center|5
|align=center|3
|align=center|5
|align=center|Play-off
|align=center bgcolor=tan|3rd place
|align=center|
|-bgcolor=SteelBlue
|align=center|2007
|align=center|4th
|align=center|3
|align=center|8
|align=center|3
|align=center|3
|align=center|2
|align=center|15
|align=center|10
|align=center|12
|align=center|
|align=center|AC
|align=center bgcolor=tan|Semifinals
|align=center|
|-bgcolor=SteelBlue
|align=center|2008
|align=center|4th
|align=center|4
|align=center|8
|align=center|2
|align=center|1
|align=center|5
|align=center|10
|align=center|13
|align=center|7
|align=center|
|align=center|AC
|align=center|Round of 16
|align=center|
|-bgcolor=SteelBlue
|align=center|2009
|align=center rowspan=2|4th
|align=center rowspan=2|4
|align=center rowspan=2|6
|align=center rowspan=2|2
|align=center rowspan=2|0
|align=center rowspan=2|4
|align=center rowspan=2|4
|align=center rowspan=2|5
|align=center rowspan=2|6
|align=center rowspan=2|
|align=center|AC
|align=center bgcolor=silver|Final
|align=center|
|-
|align=center|2009–10
|align=center|PFL LC
|align=center|Group Stage
|align=center|
|-
|align=left colspan=14 align=center|FC Slavutych Cherkasy
|-bgcolor=SteelBlue
|align=center|2011
|align=center|4th
|align=center|5
|align=center|10
|align=center|4
|align=center|0
|align=center|6
|align=center|8
|align=center|17
|align=center|12
|align=center|
|align=center|
|align=center|
|align=center|
|-bgcolor=PowderBlue
|align=center|2011–12
|align=center|3rd "A"
|align=center|3
|align=center|26
|align=center|15
|align=center|8
|align=center|3
|align=center|35
|align=center|15
|align=center|53
|align=center| finals
|align=center|
|align=center|
|align=center|
|-bgcolor=PowderBlue
|align=center rowspan="2"|2012–13
|align=center|3rd "A"
|align=center|4	
|align=center|20 	
|align=center|10 	
|align=center|4 	
|align=center|6 	
|align=center|26 	
|align=center|18 	
|align=center|34
|align=center rowspan="2"| finals
|align=center|
|align=center|
|align=center|
|-bgcolor=PowderBlue
|align=center|3rd "1"
|align=center|3
|align=center|30 	
|align=center|15 		
|align=center|7
|align=center|8
|align=center|47 		
|align=center|28 	
|align=center|52
|align=center|
|align=center|
|align=center|Stage 2
|-bgcolor=PowderBlue
|align=center|2013–14
|align=center|3rd
|align=center|7
|align=center|36
|align=center|20
|align=center|5
|align=center|11
|align=center|49
|align=center|33
|align=center|65
|align=center bgcolor=#A67D3D| finals
|align=center|
|align=center|
|align=center|
|-
|align=left colspan=14 align=center|FC Cherkaskyi Dnipro
|-bgcolor=PowderBlue
|align=center|2014–15
|align=center|3rd
|align=center bgcolor=gold|1
|align=center|27
|align=center|20
|align=center|5
|align=center|2
|align=center|54
|align=center|12
|align=center|65
|align=center| finals
|align=center|
|align=center|
|align=center bgcolor=lightgreen|Promoted
|-bgcolor=LightCyan
|align=center|2015–16
|align=center|2nd
|align=center bgcolor=silver|2
|align=center|30 	
|align=center|16 	
|align=center|7 	
|align=center|7 	
|align=center|45 	
|align=center|27 	 	
|align=center|55
|align=center| finals
|align=center|
|align=center|
|align=center|
|-bgcolor=LightCyan
|align=center|2016–17
|align=center|2nd
|align=center|8
|align=center|34 	
|align=center|12 	
|align=center|12 	
|align=center|10 	
|align=center|30 	
|align=center|29 	
|align=center|48
|align=center| finals
|align=center|
|align=center|
|align=center|
|-bgcolor=LightCyan
|align=center|2017–18
|align=center|2nd
|align=center|17
|align=center|33 
|align=center|	 8 
|align=center|4 
|align=center|21 
|align=center|27
|align=center|	47 	
|align=center|28	
|align=center| finals
|align=center|
|align=center|
|align=center bgcolor=pink|Relegated
|-
|align=left colspan=14 align=center|Reformed as FC Cherkashchyna-Akademiya Bilozirya
|-bgcolor=PowderBlue
|align=center|2018–19
|align=center|3rd
|align=center bgcolor=silver|2
|align=center|27 	
|align=center|14	
|align=center|6 	
|align=center|7 	
|align=center|43 	
|align=center|23	 	
|align=center|48
|align=center| finals
|align=center|
|align=center|
|align=center bgcolor=lightgreen|Promoted
|-
|align=left colspan=14 align=center|FC Cherkashchyna
|-bgcolor=LightCyan
|align=center|2019–20
|align=center|2nd
|align=center|16
|align=center|30
|align=center|1
|align=center|4
|align=center|25
|align=center|23
|align=center|74
|align=center|7
|align=center| finals
|align=center|
|align=center|
|align=center bgcolor=pink|Lost playoffs; Relegated
|-bgcolor=PowderBlue
|align=center|2020–21
|align=center|3rd
|align=center|—
|align=center|10
|align=center|5
|align=center|4
|align=center|1
|align=center|14
|align=center|7
|align=center|19
|align=center| finals
|align=center|
|align=center|
|align=center bgcolor=grey|Withdrew; Results annulled
|}

List of head coaches 
 2011–2012: Oleksandr Kyrylyuk
 2012–2013: Anatoliy Deineko (caretaker)
 2013: Serhiy Puchkov
 2013: Ihor Petrov
 2013–2014: Yuriy Bakalov
 2014: Ihor Stolovytskyi (caretaker)
 2014–2016: Ihor Stolovytskyi
 2016: Oleksandr Kyrylyuk
 2016: Vitaliy Kobzar (caretaker)
 2016–2017: Vadym Yevtushenko
 2017: Vitaliy Kobzar (caretaker)
 2017: Oleksandr Kyrylyuk
 2017–2018: Ihor Stolovytskyi
 2018–: Oleksandr Kyrylyuk

See also 
 Dnipro Cherkasy
 Zorya Bilozirya

References

External links 
  Official website

 
Football clubs in Cherkasy
Defunct football clubs in Ukraine
Association football clubs established in 2010
Association football clubs disestablished in 2021
2010 establishments in Ukraine
2021 disestablishments in Ukraine
Phoenix clubs (association football)